Pycanum is a genus of bugs in the family Tessaratomidae.

Species
 Pycanum ochraceum Distant, 1893
 Pycanum oculatum Jensen-Haarup, 1931
 Pycanum ponderosum Stål, 1854
 Pycanum pretiosum Stål, 1854
 Pycanum rubens (Fabricius, 1794) (= alternatum Lepeletier & Serville, 1828)

References

External links
 

Tessaratomidae
Hemiptera genera